Puistomäki (Finnish; Parkbacken in Swedish) is a district in the Uittamo-Skanssi ward of the city of Turku, in Finland. It is located to the south of the city centre, and is mainly a low-density residential suburb.

 the population of Puistomäki was 734, and was increasing at an annual rate of 6.13%. 17.30% of the district's population are under 15 years old, while 12.81% are over 65. The district's linguistic makeup is 90.46% Finnish, 5.59% Swedish, and 3.95% other.

See also
 Districts of Turku
 Districts of Turku by population

Districts of Turku